Martinpuich is a commune in the Pas-de-Calais department in the Hauts-de-France region of France.

Geography

Population

Places of interest
 The church of St.Pierre, rebuilt as was most of the village after the First World War.
 The Commonwealth War Graves Commission cemetery.

See also
Capture of Martinpuich
Communes of the Pas-de-Calais department

References

External links

 The CWGC cemetery

Communes of Pas-de-Calais